Gayatri Reddy is an Indian anthropologist who has also made contributions to queer and gender studies.

Reddy received her PhD in Anthropology in 2000 from Emory University after M.A in Anthropology from Columbia University and B.A. in Psychology from Delhi University. She is currently an associate professor in Anthropology and Gender and Women's Studies at the University of Illinois at Chicago. Reddy has carried out fieldwork on a community of Hyderabad, Andhra Pradesh in India. Her current research is on male queer identity among South Asian immigrants to the US.

Reddy is the Association for Feminist Anthropology Program Chair for 2007, and a member of the steering committee for the University Consortium for Sexuality Research and Training at the Kinsey Institute.

References

External links 
 University of Illinois bio page
 Gayatri Reddy Curriculum Vitae
 Reviews of With Respect to Sex: Negotiating Hijra Identity in South India in the American Journal of Sociology, Journal of the Royal Anthropological Institute, Journal of the History of Sexuality, Feminist Studies, American Ethnologist

1982 births
Living people
Gender studies academics
Indian academics
Queer theorists
Emory University alumni
University of Illinois Chicago faculty
Indian anthropologists
Indian women anthropologists